Mick Doohan is an Australian five-time Grand Prix world champion - all five of which are in the premier 500cc class (now known as MotoGP). Doohan raced for Honda's factory team for the entirety of his career.

His 54 Grand Prix victories are the equal seventh highest of all time (with Dani Pedrosa). His most successful circuit is Mugello Circuit where he has won six times. Doohan's largest margin of victory was at the 1992 Japanese Grand Prix when he beat Doug Chandler by 28.298 seconds in the race, and his smallest margin of victory was at the 1996 City of Imola Grand Prix when he beat teammate Àlex Crivillé by 0.104 seconds in the race.

Wins
Key:
 No. – Victory number.
 Race – Motorcycle Grand Prix career race start number.
 Grid – Starting position on grid.
 Margin – Margin of victory (min:sec.ms).
  – Riders' Championship winning season.

Number of wins at different Grands Prix

Number of wins at different circuits

See also
 List of Grand Prix motorcycle racing winners
 List of MotoGP rider records

References

Grand Prix motorcycle racing riders
Doohan, Mick